Nation Radio South Coast is a classic hits  radio station broadcasting on 106 MHz & 106.6 MHz FM, on DAB on the South Hampshire multiplex across the South Coast of England and on DAB+ across a limited area on the Portsmouth small scale trial multiplex. 

The station is owned by Nation Broadcasting which was under a licensing  agreement with operator Bauer Radio. In September 2022, the agreement ended and the station has become part of the Nation Radio network.

As of December 2022, the station broadcasts to a weekly audience of 136,000, according to RAJAR.

History

Original 106 & The Coast
The station was originally launched in 2006 as Original 106 (Solent), owned by Canwest, which then sold the station to Celador in August 2008. It was replaced by The Coast 106 on 30 October 2008, and while initial RAJAR results were encouraging with a healthy increase over those posted by Original, the weekly reach stagnated at around 115,000 by early 2011.

Jack FM

Celador then rebranded the station as Jack FM, to bring it in line with its sister station in Bristol, from 4 July 2011.  All prior presenters except Robin Caddy were removed from the station, which switched to a format also used by Celador's other Jack stations - a presenter-led breakfast show (hosted by Bam Bam), a Saturday morning "World Of Sport" show presented by Robin Caddy and automated music interspersed with topical one-liners in between songs voiced by actor Paul Darrow at other times.

Sam FM

On 1 April 2015, the station was rebranded again as Sam FM, which runs with a strapline of We're In Charge - the station controls the music and doesn't play requests - interspersed with topical one-liners in between songs by Gareth Hale who is referred to as The Voice of Sam FM. However, as of the  end of 2019 these one-liners have long since been withdrawn.
 
In March 2019, Sam FM South Coast was taken over by Nation Broadcasting following the sale of Celador Radio to Bauer Radio.

On 1 December 2019, Sam FM no longer shared programming with its sister stations in Bristol and Swindon and took the tagline The South's Greatest Hits. This appears to have had an effect on the playlist, with less rock and more pop tracks being played than previously.

Greatest Hits Radio
It was announced that from 27 May 2020, Sam FM will become Greatest Hits Radio in early September after Nation Broadcasting agreed a licensing agreement with Bauer Radio. From 1 September 2020 Greatest Hits Radio was launched at 6am.

Nation Radio
On 19 September 2022, the station relaunched as Nation Radio South.

Transmitters

Analogue (FM)

Following the station's previous launch, Coast 106 made use of a restricted service licence from Ofcom to re-broadcast the station to Guernsey. This was done to promote the station to Guernsey residents for when they travelled to England.

Digital (DAB)

See also
Easy Radio South Coast
Nation Broadcasting

References

External links
 Official website

 

Radio stations established in 2011
Radio stations in Dorset
Radio stations in Hampshire
Radio stations in the Isle of Wight
Jack FM stations
Nation Broadcasting